WMQX is a radio station (102.3 FM) licensed to Pittston, Pennsylvania.

WMQX may also refer to:

 WBKQ, a radio station (96.7 FM) licensed to Alexandria, Indiana, which held the call sign WMQX from 2009 to 2014
 WPAW, a radio station (96.7 FM) licensed to Greensboro, North Carolina, which held the call sign WMQX-FM from 1987 to 2006
 WPOL, a radio station (1340 AM) licensed to Winston-Salem, North Carolina, which held the call sign WMQX from 1987 to 1995